Rone (born Erwan Castex, 20 June 1980) is a French electronic music producer and artist.

History

Early steps 

Erwan Castex was born in Boulogne-Billancourt, France. He grew up in Paris. His first EP "Bora" came out in 2008 on the French label InFiné. French DJ/Producer Agoria selected the track for his mix compilation "At the Controls", attracting immediate support from a good part of the electronic music scene, for instance in the UK (Massive Attack's 3D, Sasha and London's Fabric resident DJ Lee Burridge).

2009–2010: Debut album Spanish Breakfast, a change of status 

In 2009, Rone released a new maxi, entitled "La Dame Blanche". The track was later remixed by LCD Soundsystem's bass player Tyler Pope and Austrian electronic music artist Clara Moto. The same year he brought out his first full-length album "Spanish Breakfast", also on Infiné. Electronic Beats ranked him in their top 25 Best Albums of 2009.

2011–2012: Berlin, new inspiration, new album 

In 2011, in search of new inspiration, Rone decided to leave his hometown Paris for Berlin. This led in spring of 2011 to release of the critically acclaimed EP So So So. 
A second album entitled « Tohu Bohu » (Biblical Hebrew expression meaning chaos) followed in October 2012, likewise on Infiné. The album featured the single Let's Go, with vocals by US rapper High Priest from New York's Antipop Consortium
Resident Advisor gave the album 4 out of 5 and Rone won three 2012 Trax Magazine awards : Best French Artist, Best Album and Best Music Video.

Tohu Bohu gave rise to three singles : Parade, Bye Bye Macadam and Let's Go. All three singles were promoted by videos, the most successful, Bye Bye Macadam, having been viewed more than 40 million times on YouTube and been shown on Cartoon Network in Adult Swim's Off the Air episode "Worship".

2013: Tohu Bohu Tour, collaborations and Tohu Bonus 

Early in 2013 the US indie band The National asked Rone to add some electronic sequences to their new album "Trouble Will Find Me" on 4AD. Rone added his distinctive to parts of the album. As The National's lead singer Matt Berninger said in an interview "Rone's work has brought something fresh to our sound, I’m not saying we re-invented ourselves as a band, but we’ve opened new doors"
The same year, Gabriel & Dresden, Juan Atkins, Clark (musician) and Dominik Eulberg remixed respectively the tracks Bye Bye Macadam, Let's Go, and Parade and the godfather of French electronic music Jean-Michel Jarre was so interested by Rone's productions that he selected two of his tracks to feature on the compilation "Infiné by JMJ"
The album Tohu Bohu was later re-released with a bonus disc with 6 unreleased tracks, one of them features John Stanier on drums

2014: Apache EP – North American tour 

2014 saw the release of the Apache EP, in April. Simultaneously Rone toured North America for the first time in his career, finishing off with an appearance at Coachella Valley Music and Arts Festival's The Do LaB Stage.
In the same year, Rone made remixes for iconic French pop singer Etienne Daho and Breton (band)

Testing new technologies 
He also collaborates with sound engineers from Radio France on binaural versions of the tracks "Apache", "Quitter la ville" and "Acid Reflux", reproducing an audio 3D effect.

2015 : Third album: Creatures 
After multiple tours around the world, Rone goes back to Paris and releases his third album, Creatures, on 9 February 2015.
Various artists have collaborated on this album: Étienne Daho, François Marry (leader of pop group Frànçois and The Atlas Mountains), cellist Gaspar Claus, Bryce Dessner
(leader of the group The National, trumpet player Toshinori Kondo.

Rone also releases a 360° Virtual Reality project Quitter La Ville in collaboration with La Blogothèque. The video was one of the first digital simulation clips, making him a pioneer in the Virtual Reality field.

2017: La Philharmonie de Paris / Fourth album: Mirapolis 
On 14 January 2017 Rone performed a bespoke piece at the Philharmonie de Paris, for which he invited various guest artists: the drummer John Stanier of the group Battles, the science-fiction writer Alain Damasio, the leader of Frànçois and The Atlas Mountains François Marry.

On 23 March 2017 Erwan Castex received the French honorary decoration of Chevalier de l'Ordre des Arts et des Lettres

On 3 November 2017 Rone released his fourth album Mirapolis. The title was inspired by his childhood memories at the Mirapolis theme park, which closed in 1991. For Mirapolis, Castex pushed further his collaborative work by working alongside film director Michel Gondry who has illustrated the album cover. His fourth album also includes various international collaborators—John Stanier the drummer of the Battles, Kazu Makino from the vocal trio Blonde Redhead, Bryce Dessner the guitarist of The National, and Baxter Dury.

2020 : Room With A View 
Invited by Ruth Mackenzie, the artistic director of Théâtre du Châtelet, Rone receives a carte blanche for 9 representations, from March 5 to 14.  Rone decides to collaborate with the collective (La)Horde for Room With A View. This project is both a musical and choreographic piece, performed by 18 dancers from the Ballet national de Marseille. This creative project mainly addresses the messages of climate change. Simultaneously, Room With A View becomes the fifth album of the artist.

In 2020, Rone composed the original soundtrack for the feature film Night Ride. The score has led to his prize for best original soundtrack at the Festival International du film de Saint- Jean-de Luzz and at the Festival de La Baule. Rone also took home the 2021 César Award for Best Original Music.

2021 : Rone & Friends - L(oo)ping 

After previous projects being held back due to the Covid-19 pandemic, Rone decides to produce a collaborative album with his vocalist friends: Odezenne, Georgia, Jehnny Beth, Dominique A, Laura Etchgoyhen, Alain Damasio, Mood, Flavien Berger, Yael Naim, Malibu, Camélia Jordana, Casper Clausen, Melissa Laveaux and Roya Arab.

On June 25 and 26 2021, Rone also presented L(oo)ping, an electro-classic concert, held at the Auditorium Maurice-Ravel, accompanied by 81 musicians from the Orchestre national de Lyon, the pianist Vanessa Wagner and the choir Bostgehio, under the direction of the Belgian conductor Dirk Brossé.

Discography

Studio albums

Extended plays

Remixes

Collaborations

Filmography 
 2010: The Cord Woman (Original soundtrack)
 2014: The Beast (short film) (Original soundtrack)
 2016 : Half Sister, Full Love, Opening credits (Bye Bye Macadam)
 2016 : I, Philip (Original soundtrack)
 2016 : I Want Pluto to be a planet again (Original soundtrack)
 2020 : Night Ride (Original soundtrack)
 2021 : Paris, 13th District (feature film) / 'Les Olympiades (Original soundtrack)

Choreographic pieces
2020: Room With A View, (La)Horde & Rode with the Ballet National de Marseille at the Théâtre du Châtelet

Distinctions
2017:Chevalier des Arts et des Lettres
2020: Grand Prix SACEM for electronic music
2021—46th César Awards: Disque d'Or of Cannes Soundtrack Award (Festival de Cannes) for the original soundtrack of Les Olympiades. 
2022—47th César Awards: nominated for César Award for Best Original Music for Les Olympiades''.

References

External links 
 Rone homepage
 Rone discography on Discogs

1980 births
French electronic musicians
Living people